Greek Brazilians are Brazilian residents who are either fully or partially of Greek descent. They are located throughout Brazil with estimated numbers that range from about 30,000 people to 50,000 Greeks living in São Paulo alone.

Notable Greek Brazilians
 João Pandiá Calógeras, Brazilian Minister of War during WWI
 Bruna Griphao - television actress
 Demetre Anastassakis - architect and urban planner
 Cleo Rocos - comedy actress, presenter and business woman
 Constantine Andreou - painter and sculptor
 Constantino Tsallis - physicist
 Miguel Nicolelis - neuroscientist
 Pavlos Papaioannou - former football player
 Ronald Golias - comedian
 Silvio Santos - TV host and entrepreneur
 Vitor Belfort - Mixed Martial Artist
 Leonardo Koutris - footballer

See also
 Immigration to Brazil
 White Brazilians
 Greek people
 Greek diaspora
 Brazil–Greece relations

References

 Bilateral relations between Greece and Brazil

 
European Brazilian
Brazil